The Lewis River is an  tributary of the Snake River. The entire course of the river is located within the boundaries of Yellowstone National Park in Wyoming, US. The river is named for Meriwether Lewis, commander of the Lewis and Clark Expedition.

This short stretch of the river is the only portion of the river where boating is permitted. The river reemerges at the southern end of Lewis Lake and flows in a general southerly direction through a steep canyon roughly paralleling the south entrance road toward the south entrance of the park. Below Lewis Lake the river passes over several cascades and waterfalls including Lewis Falls. Shortly before leaving the park, the Lewis River merges with the Snake River, changing the course of the Snake southward. The Snake soon flows out of Yellowstone into Grand Teton National Park and Jackson Lake.

The Lewis River has rapids up to Class VI and takes a  drop at Lewis Falls, the most famous of many waterfalls and rapids on this short but scenic river.

Brown, rainbow and Yellowstone cutthroat trout are found in the river.

See also
 Fishes of Yellowstone National Park
Heart River

References

Rivers of Yellowstone National Park
Rivers of Wyoming
Tributaries of the Snake River
Rivers of Teton County, Wyoming
Wild and Scenic Rivers of the United States